Samokhvalov is a Russian masculine surname, its feminine counterpart is Samokhvalova. It may refer to

Aleksandr Samokhvalov (disambiguation)
Andrei Samokhvalov (born 1975), Kazakhstani ice hockey player
Innokenti Samokhvalov (1997-2020), Russian football player
Maria Kleschar-Samokhvalova (1915–2000), Russian painter and graphic artist
Svetlana Samokhvalova (born 1972), Russian cyclist 

Russian-language surnames